The Shenji New Village is a former dormitory area in West District, Taichung, Taiwan.

History
The place used to be the dormitory area built by the Taiwan Provincial Government for the residence of auditing office employees. It was then redeveloped into a cultural and creative center.

Architecture
The area features artist studios, creative shops and markets which spans over an area of 0.52 hectares.

See also 
 Liming New Village

References

External links

 

Buildings and structures in Taichung